Beating like a Drum is the third extended play by Australian band, Eskimo Joe, released on 4 August 2007. Originally only a limited number were available at shows on their Beating like a Drum national tour.

The EP features six original Eskimo Joe tracks remixed by Dexter, Sneaky Sound System, Teenager, P-Money, and Bumblebeez, and a mash-up of "Black Fingernails, Red Wine" and "From the Sea" by Nick Launay.

Track listing

Release history

References

Eskimo Joe albums
EPs by Australian artists
2007 EPs